Thomas Mattias Poppler Isherwood (born 28 January 1998) is a Swedish professional footballer who plays for Darmstadt 98 as a central defender.

Isherwood has played in Sweden, Germany and England for Brommapojkarna, Bayern Munich, Bradford City and Östersund. He is also a former Sweden youth international.

Early and personal life
Isherwood's father is English and his mother is Swedish.

Club career

Isherwood began his youth career with Fruängens IFm and his senior career with Brommapojkarna, making one appearance in the Swedish Cup in 2014. He moved to Germany to play for Bayern Munich in July 2015, and made  senior appearances in the Regionalliga with Bayern's second team.

In 2015 he was linked with English club Manchester City. In April 2018 he was linked with a transfer to Scottish club Celtic, and he also trialled with Scottish club Rangers at the end of the 2017–18 season.

In June 2018 he signed a two-year contract with English Bradford City. He said the club's youth player development appealed to him. In January 2019 he was linked with a transfer away from the club, back to Sweden. He later left the club by mutual consent. Later that month he signed for Swedish club Östersund.

In January 2021, he signed for 2. Bundesliga side Darmstadt 98 for an undisclosed fee on a contract until 2024.

International career
Isherwood represented Sweden at youth international levels from under-17 to under-21. He is also eligible to represent England.

References

1998 births
Living people
Swedish footballers
Association football defenders
Sweden youth international footballers
Sweden under-21 international footballers
Allsvenskan players
2. Bundesliga players
Regionalliga players
IF Brommapojkarna players
FC Bayern Munich footballers
FC Bayern Munich II players
Bradford City A.F.C. players
Östersunds FK players
SV Darmstadt 98 players
English Football League players
Swedish expatriate footballers
Swedish expatriate sportspeople in Germany
Expatriate footballers in Germany
Swedish expatriate sportspeople in England
Expatriate footballers in England
Swedish people of English descent